Mnestiidae is a family of gastropods belonging to the order Cephalaspidea.

Genera:
 Mnestia H. Adams & A. Adams, 1854
 Ventomnestia Iredale, 1936

References

Gastropods